Llandeilo Rural District Council was a local authority in east Carmarthenshire, Wales created in 1894. The first election to the authority was held in December 1894.

Llandeilo Rural District Council was responsible for housing, sanitation and public health and also had some control over roads and water supply.

During the early years of the twentieth century, following a substantial growth in the population of the Welsh anthracite coalfield, two new urban districts were carved out of the Llandeilo Rural District. The Ammanford Urban District was created in 1903 out of parts of the parishes of Betws and Llandybie. In 1912, the Cwmamman Urban District was formed, taking on parts of the parishes of Betws and Llandeilo Fawr.

The authority covered the parishes of Betws, Brechfa, Llandeilo Fawr (Rural), Llandybie, Llandyfeisant, Llanegwad, Llanfihangel Aberbythych, Llanfihangel Cilfragen, Llanfynydd, Llansawel, Talley and Quarter Bach.

The authority was abolished following local government reorganisation in 1974, and its role taken on by Dinefwr Borough Council.

References

Rural districts of Wales
Districts of Wales created by the Local Government Act 1894
Politics of Carmarthenshire
Rural District